Albert Giraud (23 June 1860 – 26 December 1929) was a Belgian poet who wrote in  French.

Biography
Giraud was born Emile Albert Kayenbergh in Leuven, Belgium. He studied law at the University of Leuven. He left university without a degree and took up journalism and poetry. In 1885, Giraud became a member of La Jeune Belgique, a Belgian nationalist literary movement that met at the Café Sésino in Brussels. Giraud became chief librarian at the Belgian Ministry of the Interior.

He was a Symbolist poet. His published works include Pierrot lunaire: Rondels bergamasques (1884), a poem cycle based on the commedia dell'arte figure of Pierrot, and La Guirlande des Dieux (1910). The composer Arnold Schönberg set a German-language version (translated by Otto Erich Hartleben) of selections from his Pierrot Lunaire to innovative atonal music. In a different, late romantic style, some of Hartleben's translations found their way into the vocal works of Joseph Marx.

Works
Pierrot lunaire: Rondels bergamasques (1884)
Hors du Siècle (poems written between 1885 and 1897)
Le concert dans la musée (1921) 
Le Miroir caché (sonnets) (1921)

Notes

References
Albert Giraud's Pierrot Lunaire, translated and with an introduction by Gregory C. Richter, Truman State University Press, 2001.
Albert Giraud, "Pierrot Lunaire," Schoenberg's selection, translated by Cecil Gray http://ada.evergreen.edu/~arunc/texts/music/pierrot/pierrot.pdf.
Albert Giraud, Le Miroir caché, Éditions de la Vie Intellectuelle, Bruxelles, 1921. 
Arnold Schoenberg, "Complete performance: Schoenberg's Pierrot lunaire," Ricardo Muti & Chicago SO, recorded February, 2012, with English subtitles. https://www.youtube.com/watch?v=bd2cBUJmDr8.

1860 births
1929 deaths
Belgian poets in French
Symbolist poets